Kafsh Kal Mahalleh (also Romanized as Kafsh Kal Maḩalleh; also known as Kafsh Kal) is a village in Otaqvar Rural District, Otaqvar District, Langarud County, Gilan Province, Iran. At the 2006 census, its population was 457, in 131 families.

References 

Populated places in Langarud County